Marlene M. Maheu is an American telehealth strategist, technologist and clinical psychologist. She founded and is currently the Executive Director of the Telebehavioral Health Institute (TBHI), now known as Telehealth.org. Maheu is the founder of the Journal for Technology in Behavioral Science (JTiBS). She has published more than 50 journal articles and books on telehealth.

Education 
Maheu graduated summa cum laude from the University of Hartford with a BA in Psychology. She graduated from the California School of Professional Psychology in San Diego, California with both a Master of Arts and PhD (1985) in Clinical Psychology.
Maheu has also served as an editor for the peer-reviewed journals Professional Psychology: Research and Practice and Psychological Services, both of which are published by the American Psychological Association. From 2011 to 2015, Maheu has served as a Faculty Associate at the Cummings Graduate Institute for Behavioral Health Studies at Arizona State University. Maheu is currently based in San Diego, California.

Career 
Maheu has worked in telehealth as one of her primary professional focus areas. She has served on a number of task forces, committees, and work groups to develop telehealth-related standards and guidelines for the American Telemedicine Association, the American Psychological Association, and the American Counseling Association.

Memberships 
Maheu is a member of the American Psychological Association. She is also a member of the American Telemedicine Association, American Counseling Association, California Psychological Association, and various other associations.

Selected publications 
Maheu has published over Selected publications by Marlene M. Maheu include the following.

Articles 
 
 
 
 
 
 
 
 
 
 Maheu, M. M., and McMenamin, J. (2013, March 28). Telepsychiatry: The perils of using Skype.

Books 
Some of Maheu's books are:

 ‌Maheu, M. M., Drude, K., Merrill, C., Callan, J. E., & Hilty, D. M. (2020). Telebehavioral health foundations in theory & practice for graduate learners. Cognella.

References

External links 
 
 

Alliant International University alumni
University of Hartford alumni
Living people
1954 births
American clinical psychologists